Conservation land trusts are nonprofit organizations that acquire and steward land or conservation easements for the purpose of achieving environmental, agricultural, recreational, and/or species conservation goals. Conservation land trusts often work in cooperation with landowners to achieve shared goals and may provide public outreach events on the themes of science, environmental issues, species conservation, or other topics relevant to the land they work to protect. Priorities of conservation land trusts vary, but may include goals related to water quality, public access to land, and biodiversity. Oversight of these priorities and of the work carried out by the land trust typically rests with a board of directors. Conservation land trusts may operate in partnership with government agencies or under broader umbrella nonprofit organizations. Land trusts may focus their work in specific local areas delineated by political boundaries, habitat types, or ecological zones. Funding can be limited for the work of these organizations, such that many rely on volunteer labor.

Regional land trusts

Although there are some global conservation land trust organizations that do work across multiple continents, such as the World Land Trust and The Nature Conservancy, most land trusts focus on smaller regional areas. Conservation land trust organizations exist all across the world, and many belong to the International Land Conservation Network.

Land trusts in Africa

Some African conservation land trusts:

 Nature Conservation Egypt
 Nature Mauritania
 Save Valley Conservancy

Land trusts in North America

In North America, most conservation land trusts are found in the United States, with a growing number in Canada and Mexico. In the United States, the first conservation land trust organization was the Massachusetts Trustees of Reservations, founded in 1891. As of 2021, there were over 1,300 conservation land trusts in the United States, with 446 of these accredited by the Land Trust Accreditation Commission. 

Some North American conservation land trusts:

 The Black Family Land Trust 
 Blue Mountain Land Trust 
 Center for Natural Lands Management 
 Crooked Creek Conservancy
 Edmonton and Area Land Trust 
 Maryland Environmental Trust 
 Northcentral Pennsylvania Conservancy
 Sierra Gorda 
 Sociedad De Historia Natural Niparajá A.C.

Land trusts in South America

Some South American conservation land trusts:

 Corporación Ambiental La Pedregoza
 Red Sudamericana de Conservacion Voluntaria (South American Network for Voluntary Conservation)
 Reserva Termas de Sotomó

Land trusts in Asia

Some Asian conservation land trusts:

 Asian Nature Conservation Foundation
 The National Trust of Korea
 Viet Nature Conservation Centre

Land trusts in Europe

Some European conservation land trusts:

 The Burrenbeo Trust
 Naturschutzstiftung Landkreis Aurich
 The Woodland Trust

Land trusts in Oceania

Some conservation land trusts in Oceania:

 Gondwana Link
 New Zealand Farm Environment Trust
 Tasmanian Land Conservancy

References

External links 

 International Land Conservation Network
 Land Trust Alliance (US)

Protected areas